The First Lady of the Gambia is the official title of the wife of the President or Head of State of The Gambia. Since January 19, 2017, Fatoumatta Bah-Barrow has been First Lady.

Since polygamy (or more precisely polygyny) is legal and widespread in Gambia, several heads of government were married several times. However, only one wife bears the title of First Lady at a time. When he took office in 2017, President Adama Barrow decreed that only his first wife, Fatoumatta Bah-Barrow, would be designated as first lady.

List of first ladies

Parliamentary monarchy (1965–1970)
On February 18, 1965, the former British colony of Gambia gained complete independence as a parliamentary monarchy. The head of state was still the Queen of the Gambia, British Queen Elizabeth II, who was represented in the Gambia by the Governor-General.

The head of government during this period was Dawda Jawara (the prime minister from 1962 to 1963 and prime minister from 1963 to 1970).

Republic (from 1970)

References

First ladies of the Gambia
Gambia